Boxing magazine The Ring has awarded world championships in professional boxing within each weight class from its foundation in 1922. The first Ring world title belt was awarded to heavyweight champion Jack Dempsey, and the second was awarded to flyweight champion Pancho Villa.  The magazine stopped giving belts to world champions in the 1990s, but reintroduced their titles in 2001.

Boxers who won the title but were immediately stripped and the title bout being overturned to a no contest will not be listed.

Heavyweight

Cruiserweight

Light heavyweight

Super middleweight

Middleweight

Junior middleweight

Welterweight

Junior welterweight

Lightweight

Junior lightweight

Featherweight

Junior featherweight

Bantamweight

Junior bantamweight

Flyweight

Junior flyweight

Strawweight
The Ring has not yet awarded a championship in the strawweight division.

See also
 The Ring
 List of The Ring female world champions
 Lineal championship
 List of current world boxing champions
 List of current female world boxing champions
 List of undisputed world boxing champions
 List of WBA world champions
 List of WBC world champions
 List of IBF world champions
 List of WBO world champions
 List of IBO world champions
 Current The Ring pound for pound list
 List of The Ring pound for pound rankings

References

External links
Official list of current Ring champions
https://boxrec.com/media/index.php/The_Ring_Magazine%27s_Annual_Ratings

World champions
Ring world champions
Ring